Ain Seppik (born 12 March 1952 in Tallinn) is an Estonian politician. He has been a member of the X and XI Riigikogu representing the Estonian Centre Party. 2002-2003 he was Minister of the Interior.

References

Living people
1952 births
Estonian Centre Party politicians
Ministers of the Interior of Estonia
Members of the Riigikogu, 2003–2007
Members of the Riigikogu, 2007–2011
20th-century Estonian politicians
21st-century Estonian politicians
Recipients of the Order of the White Star, 5th Class
University of Tartu alumni
Politicians from Tallinn